William Wardle (20 January 1918 – January 1989) was an English professional footballer born in Hetton-le-Hole, County Durham, who played as an outside left. He made 239 appearances in the Football League playing for Southport, Manchester City, Grimsby Town, Blackpool, Birmingham City and Barnsley.

References
 
 

1918 births
1989 deaths
People from Hetton-le-Hole
Footballers from Tyne and Wear
English footballers
Association football outside forwards
Southport F.C. players
Manchester City F.C. players
Grimsby Town F.C. players
Blackpool F.C. players
Birmingham City F.C. players
Barnsley F.C. players
Skegness Town A.F.C. players
English Football League players
Date of death missing
Place of death missing
Association football midfielders